The Philadelphia Phillies are a Major League Baseball team based in Philadelphia, Pennsylvania. They  are a member of the Eastern Division of Major League Baseball's National League. The team has played officially under two names since beginning play in 1883: the current moniker, as well as the "Quakers", which was used in conjunction with "Phillies" during the team's early history. The team was also known unofficially as the "Blue Jays" during the World War II era. Since the franchise's inception,  players have made an appearance in a competitive game for the team, whether as an offensive player (batting and baserunning) or a defensive player (fielding, pitching, or both).

Of those  Phillies, 187 have had surnames beginning with the letter S. Three of those players are members of the Baseball Hall of Fame: shortstop Ryne Sandberg, who played one season for the Phillies before being traded to the Chicago Cubs and converting to second base; right fielder Casey Stengel, who played for the Phillies during the 1920 and 1921 seasons and was inducted as a manager; and third baseman Mike Schmidt, who in 1983 was named the greatest Phillie of all time during the election of Philadelphia's Centennial Team.  Schmidt is this list's only Hall of Famer to have the Phillies listed as his primary team, and is one of five members of this list to be elected to the Philadelphia Baseball Wall of Fame; the others are second baseman Juan Samuel, pitcher Bobby Shantz (inducted as a Philadelphia Athletic), pitcher Chris Short, and pitcher Curt Simmons. Schmidt holds numerous franchise records, including most hits (2,234) and most total bases (4,404), and is the only Phillie on this list to have his number retired.

Among the 99 batters in this list, left fielder and pitcher Edgar Smith has the highest batting average, at .750; he hit safely in three of his four career at-bats with Philadelphia. Other players with an average above .300 include Monk Sherlock (.324 in one season), Jim Shilling (.303 in one season), Tripp Sigman (.326 in two seasons), Lonnie Smith (.321 in four seasons), Chris Snelling (.500 in one season), Bill Sorrell (.365 in one season), John Stearns (.500 in one season), Bobby Stevens (.343 in one season), Kelly Stinnett (.429 in one season), and Joe Sullivan (.324 in three seasons). Schmidt leads all players on this list, and all Phillies, with 548 home runs and 1,595 runs batted in.

Of this list's 90 pitchers, four share the best win–loss record (1–0), in terms of winning percentage: Ben Shields, Wayne Simpson, Paul Stuffel, and Rich Surhoff. Short leads all members of this list in victories (132) and defeats (127), followed closely by Simmons in each category (115–110). Short's 1,585 strikeouts also lead, and he is followed by Curt Schilling's 1,554. The lowest earned run average (ERA) is shared by Surhoff and Jake Smith; each allowed no earned runs during their Phillies careers for an ERA of 0.00. Two other pitchers have ERAs under 2.00: Frank Scanlan (1.64) and Scott Service (1.69).

Two Phillies have made 30% or more of their Phillies appearances as both pitchers and position players. In addition to Edgar Smith's batting notes above, he amassed a 15.43 ERA as a pitcher, striking out two. John Strike was hitless in seven plate appearances as a right fielder while amassing a 1–1 record as a pitcher.

Footnotes
Key
 The National Baseball Hall of Fame and Museum determines which cap a player wears on their plaque, signifying "the team with which he made his most indelible mark". The Hall of Fame considers the player's wishes in making their decision, but the Hall makes the final decision as "it is important that the logo be emblematic of the historical accomplishments of that player's career".
 Players are listed at a position if they appeared in 30% of their games or more during their Phillies career, as defined by Baseball-Reference.com. Additional positions may be shown on the Baseball-Reference website by following each player's citation.
 Franchise batting and pitching leaders are drawn from Baseball-Reference.com. A total of 1,500 plate appearances are needed to qualify for batting records, and 500 innings pitched or 50 decisions are required to qualify for pitching records.
 Statistics are correct as of the end of the 2010 Major League Baseball season.

Table
Randall Simon is listed by Baseball-Reference as a first baseman, but never appeared in a game in the field for the Phillies.
Chris Snelling is listed by Baseball-Reference as an outfielder, but never appeared in a game in the field for the Phillies.
Steve Stanicek is listed by Baseball-Reference as a pinch hitter; he never appeared in a game in the field during his major league career.
Charlie Starr is listed by Baseball-Reference as a second baseman, shortstop, and third baseman, but never appeared in a game in the field for the Phillies.

References
General

Inline citations

S